The Mbomou River or Bomu (also spelled M'bomou in French) forms part of the boundary between the Central African Republic (CAR) and the Democratic Republic of the Congo (DRC).

The Mbomou merges with the Uele River to form the Ubangi River. The Ubangi, a tributary of the Congo, also serves as part of the border between the CAR and the DRC.

Gallery

References

Further reading

External links

Rivers of the Central African Republic
Rivers of the Democratic Republic of the Congo
Central African Republic–Democratic Republic of the Congo border
International rivers of Africa
Border rivers
Tributaries of the Ubangi River